María Elena Gertner (1926 – 25 January 2013) was a Chilean actress, author, and television screenwriter.

Biography 
María Elena Gertner began her literary career with the 1950 poetry collection Homenaje al miedo. In this way, she was classified within the "generation of 1950" – also called the "generation of 1957" – of which her novel Islas en la ciudad is considered one of the six key works. Among her early creations, the theatrical works La mujer que trajo la lluvia and La rosa perdida stood out. In 1964, she won the CRAV Award with her story "El invencible sueño del coronel".

Later, she participated in the Art Theater of the Ministry of Education and in chamber theaters, exhibiting her previously mentioned theatrical stories as an actress and stage director. She also starred in the 1971 film  by Helvio Soto.

Gertner wrote several telenovelas for Televisión Nacional de Chile.

In 2005, Gertner received the Pablo Neruda Order of Artistic and Cultural Merit.

Work 
Regarding the novel Islas en la ciudad, the poet Marietta Morales Rodríguez described it in the following way in the magazine Cinosargo: "The main character is the city. A Santiago that turns people into islands and represents the isolation of conflicts."

Publications

Telenovelas

Films

Theater

Notes

References

External links 
 

1932 births
2013 deaths
20th-century Chilean novelists
20th-century Chilean women writers
21st-century Chilean novelists
21st-century Chilean women writers
Chilean people of German descent
Chilean screenwriters
Chilean telenovela actresses
People from Iquique
Telenovela writers
Women soap opera writers
Chilean women novelists
20th-century Chilean dramatists and playwrights
Chilean women dramatists and playwrights